Heliconia is a genus of flowering plants.

It may also refer to:
 Heliconia, Antioquia, town in Colombia
 Comocritis heliconia, a moth in the family Xyloryctidae
 Asota heliconia, is a moth in the family Erebidae
Heliconia Press, Canadian book publisher and television company founded by  Ken Whiting

Similar spelling
 Helicon (disambiguation), and Heliconian, various meanings
 Helliconia, science fiction trilogy by Brian Aldiss
 Heliconius, a butterfly genus